The Agreement between Ukraine and Russia on the Black Sea Fleet in Ukraine, widely referred to as the Kharkiv Pact or Kharkov Accords, was a treaty between Ukraine and Russia whereby the Russian lease on naval facilities in Crimea was extended beyond 2017 until 2042, with an additional five-year renewal option in exchange for a multiyear discounted contract to provide Ukraine with Russian natural gas. 

The agreement, signed on 21 April 2010 in Kharkiv, Ukraine, by Ukrainian President Viktor Yanukovych and Russian President Dmitry Medvedev and ratified by the parliaments of the two countries on 27 April 2010, aroused much controversy in Ukraine. The treaty was effectively a continuation of the lease provisions that were part of the 1997 Black Sea Fleet Partition Treaty between the two states. Shortly after the annexation of Crimea by the Russian Federation in March 2014, Russia unilaterally terminated the treaty on 31 March 2014.

History

In 1997, Russia and Ukraine signed the Partition Treaty, establishing two independent national fleets and dividing armaments and bases between them. Ukraine also agreed to lease major parts of its new bases in Sevastopol to the Russian Black Sea Fleet until 2017. During the presidency of Victor Yushchenko (January 2005 – February 2010) the Ukrainian government declared that the lease would not be extended and that the fleet would have to leave Sevastopol by 2017.

Amid several Russia–Ukraine gas disputes, including a halt of natural gas supplies to European countries, the price that Ukraine had to pay for Russian natural gas was raised in 2006 and in 2009.

Negotiation
The Prime Minister of Ukraine, Mykola Azarov, and the Energy Minister, Yuriy Boyko, visited Moscow in late March 2010 to negotiate lower gas prices; neither clearly explained what Ukraine was prepared to offer in return. Following these talks Russian Prime Minister Vladimir Putin stated that Russia was prepared to discuss the revision of the price for natural gas it sells to Ukraine. Mid-April Ukrainian officials stated they are seeking an average price of $240–$260 per 1000 cubic metres for 2010. Ukraine paid an average of $305 in the first quarter of 2010 and $330 in the second quarter.

On 21 April 2010, Russian President Dmitry Medvedev and Ukrainian President Viktor Yanukovych signed an agreement in which Russia agreed to a 30% drop in the price of natural gas sold to Ukraine. Russia agreed to this in exchange for permission to extend Russia's lease of a major naval base in the Ukrainian Black Sea port of Sevastopol for an additional 25 years (to 2042) with an option for a further 5-year renewal (to 2047). The agreement put a cap on the scale of price hikes; but the main unfavourable terms for Ukraine of the 2009 gas contract remained in place.

"We have indeed reached an unprecedented agreement," the Russian president stated. "The rent [for the naval base] will be increased by an amount equivalent to that of the [gas price] discount."

Ratification and voting

The agreement was subject to approval by both the Russian and Ukrainian parliaments. Both parliaments ratified the agreement on 27 April 2010. Ratification in the Ukrainian parliament proved controversial, and several disturbances occurred during the process. In one incident, several eggs were thrown towards the speaker, Volodymyr Lytvyn, by deputies.

Voting
During a contentious voting session, half of the deputies (legislators) belonging to the ruling Party of Regions (PR) were out of their seats blocking the podium. 160 members of PR, including Rinat Akhmetov, who was not present in the session hall voted in favor of ratification. Among the opposition parties, the ratification was approved by nine members of BYuT and seven from Our Ukraine. All 27 members of the Communist Party of Ukraine and the 20 members of the Lytvyn Bloc voted for the Kharkiv Pact as well. Of those who did not belong to a faction, only Taras Chornovil, Oleksandr Fomin, and Ihor Rybakov did not support the agreement.

Results

Termination of the treaty by Russia
On 28 March 2014, one week after the annexation of Crimea by Russia Russian President Vladimir Putin submitted proposals to the State Duma on the termination of the legal effect of a number of Russian-Ukrainian agreements, including the 2010 Kharkiv Pact treaty and the Partition Treaty on the Status and Conditions of the Black Sea Fleet. The State Duma unanimously approved the unilateral dissolution of these Russian-Ukrainian agreements with 433 members of parliament voting on 31 March 2014.

Criticism
Taras Kuzio, a British-born expert on Ukrainian politics, criticized the treaty. He stated that the bill was forced through Ukraine's legislature without parliamentary debate or public discourse, and after ignoring votes against it within three important committees (two of which had negative majorities). He argued that the treaty violates the constitution, which bans permanent military bases, and that it was not discussed prior to a vote in the National Security and Defense Council as required by the constitution. Kuzio said that the treaty is illegitimate because it rests on only 220 deputies from three factions; he argued that the remaining twenty-five deputies had been blackmailed, bribed or coerced to defect from the opposition. He added that Ukrainian public support was "gained by a lie" that the deal would bring cheaper Russian gas; while in fact, a new July 2010 agreement with the IMF mandated that Ukraine increase utility prices by fifty percent on 1 August 2010 and another fifty percent in April 2011.

According to former Ukrainian Prime Minister Yulia Tymoshenko, the agreement violates part of Ukraine's constitution, which forbids the country from hosting foreign military bases after 2017. The Chairman of the Ukrainian Constitutional Court said on 23 April that only the President and the Cabinet of Ministers can request a court ruling on constitutionality. The Our Ukraine party subsequently called for the impeachment of President Yanukovych for violating the Ukrainian Constitution.

Opposition members in Ukraine and Russia expressed doubts that the agreement would be fulfilled by Ukraine's side. According to Yanukovych, the only way out of holding the state budget deficit down, as requested by the International Monetary Fund, while protecting pensioners and minimal wages, was to extend the Russian Navy lease in Crimea in exchange for cheaper natural gas. Opposition members in Ukraine described the agreement as a "sell out of national interests".

Boris Nemtsov, former leader of the Union of Right Forces, said that Russia needed the Black Sea fleet in Crimea for war with Georgia and asked rhetorically if war with Georgia was worth $40 billion.

Effects

In June 2010, Ukraine paid Gazprom around $234 per 1,000 cubic metres. However, Ukrainian consumers experienced a 50% increase in household natural gas utility prices in July 2010 (a key demand of the International Monetary Fund in exchange for a $15 billion loan). Payments increased annually since then: in August 2011, Ukraine paid Russia $350 per 1,000 cubic metres; in November 2011, it paid $400 per 1,000 cubic meters; and in January 2013, it paid $430 per 1,000 cubic metres.

In August 2011, Ukrainian Prime Minister Mykola Azarov stated that Ukraine seeks to reduce imports of Russian natural gas by two-thirds (compared with 2010) by 2016.

The treaty allowed Russia to station a limited number of troops in Crimea, 25,000 maximum.

Criminal cases against Yanukovych and ministers
In summer of 2014, the General Prosecutor of Ukraine opened a criminal case against Viktor Yanukovych on several charges following an investigation into the former president's signing of the Kharkiv Accords.

In July 2022, Ukrainian law enforcement stated that former Foreign Minister Konstiantyn Hryshchenko and former Justice Minister Oleksandr Lavrynovych were under suspicion of high treason for signing the agreement. The suspicions were filed in absentia, as the two were "hiding abroad".

References

External links

  Text of the agreement, rada.gov.ua 2010-04-27
 Text of the agreement, Ukrayinska Pravda (22 April 2010)
 The show of the century, Ukrayinska Pravda (27 April 2010) (Videos/Photos)

2010 in Ukraine
Treaties concluded in 2010
Treaties entered into force in 2010
Treaties of Ukraine
Treaties of Russia
Russia–Ukraine relations
Russia–Ukraine gas disputes
Verkhovna Rada
Military installations of Russia
2010 in international relations
Political scandals in Ukraine
History of Kharkiv
Events affected by annexation of Crimea by the Russian Federation
April 2010 events in Europe
Viktor Yanukovych
Dmitry Medvedev
April 2010 events in Ukraine